Tibor Florian may refer to:
 Tibor Flórián (volleyball) (1938–2008), Hungarian volleyball player
 Tibor Flórián (chess player) (1919–1990), Hungarian chess player